San Zenone al Po is a comune in the province of Pavia, Lombardy, Italy.

Cities and towns in Lombardy